Cophosomorpha is a genus of beetles in the family Carabidae, containing the following species:

 Cophosomorpha agilis Straneo, 1995
 Cophosomorpha alticola (Peringuey, 1899)
 Cophosomorpha anceyi (Tschitscherine, 1890)
 Cophosomorpha angulicollis Straneo, 1943
 Cophosomorpha angustibasis Straneo, 1955
 Cophosomorpha angustula Straneo, 1940
 Cophosomorpha arnoldi Straneo, 1940
 Cophosomorpha basilewskyi Straneo, 1975
 Cophosomorpha brincki Straneo, 1958
 Cophosomorpha brittoni Straneo, 1940
 Cophosomorpha caffra (Dejean, 1828)
 Cophosomorpha capicola (Tschitscherine, 1890)
 Cophosomorpha castelli (Peringuey, 1926)
 Cophosomorpha congenera (Peringuey, 1899)
 Cophosomorpha congruens (Peringuey, 1896)
 Cophosomorpha crenicollis Straneo, 1986
 Cophosomorpha dichroa (Tschitscherine, 1890)
 Cophosomorpha endroedyi Straneo, 1986
 Cophosomorpha fallaciosa (Tschitscherine, 1899)
 Cophosomorpha femoralis Straneo, 1995
 Cophosomorpha hessei Straneo, 1958
 Cophosomorpha impunctata Straneo, 1975
 Cophosomorpha laetans Peringuey, 1926
 Cophosomorpha leleupiana Straneo, 1965
 Cophosomorpha longelytrata Straneo, 1940
 Cophosomorpha longula Straneo, 1951
 Cophosomorpha loveridgei Straneo, 1951
 Cophosomorpha macroptera (Peringuey, 1899)
 Cophosomorpha minuta Straneo, 1958
 Cophosomorpha natalensis (Boheman, 1848)
 Cophosomorpha propinqua Peringuey, 1926
 Cophosomorpha pseudocastelli Straneo, 1958
 Cophosomorpha pseudodichroa Peringuey, 1926
 Cophosomorpha recticollis Straneo, 1940
 Cophosomorpha rufina Straneo, 1940
 Cophosomorpha sagittalis Straneo, 1940
 Cophosomorpha similis Straneo, 1949
 Cophosomorpha sinuatangula Tschitscherine, 1901
 Cophosomorpha soror (Tschitscherine, 1890)
 Cophosomorpha sublaetans Straneo, 1965
 Cophosomorpha vansoni Straneo, 1940

References

Pterostichinae